Islamicism may refer to:

Islamic studies
Islamic fundamentalism

See also
Islam (disambiguation)
Islamicist (disambiguation)
Muslimism (disambiguation)